The Miss Vermont USA competition is the pageant that selects the representative for the state of Vermont in the Miss USA pageant. It is formerly directed by Sanders & Associates, Inc., dba- Pageant Associates based in Buckhannon, West Virginia from 2004 to 2017 before GDB Theatre and Pageant Productions becoming the new directors of the stage pageant since 2018.

Vermont produced a Miss USA, Carlene King Johnson in 1955. The most recent placement was by Kelsey Golonka in 2022 after 40 years, who reached the semifinals. Vermont holds the record for most Miss Congeniality awards, having earned a total of five.

Five Miss Vermont USAs have competed at Miss Teen USA, four as Miss Vermont Teen USA, and one as Miss New York Teen USA. Three have also competed at Miss America, including Miss USA 1955 Carlene King Johnson, the second out of five Miss USA winners who competed at both pageants.

Prior to 2022, no sisters had been held the Miss and Teen titles in a single state. Vermont became the first state to have biological sisters holding the statewide Miss USA and Miss Teen USA titles simultaneously, when Kelsey Golonka crowned Miss and her sister Kenzie crowned Teen.

Kelsey Golonka of Montpelier was crowned Miss Vermont USA 2022 on March 27, 2022, at Spruce Peak Performing Arts Center in Stowe. She represented Vermont for the title of Miss USA 2022, placed in the Top 12.

Gallery of titleholders

Results summary
Miss USA: Carlene King Johnson (1955)
1st runners-up: Mary Verdiani (1969)
Top 11/12: Sandra Bette Taft (1971), Georgia Davis (1982), Kelsey Golonka (2022)
Vermont holds a record of 5 placements at Miss USA.

Awards
Miss Congeniality: Mary Verdiani (1969), Donna Sue Thorton (1974), Constance Crabtree (1975), Nancy Jeanne Wierzbicki (1978), Michelle Fongemie (2004)

Winners 

Color key

Note

References

Vermont
Vermont culture
Vermont-related lists
Women in Vermont
Recurring events established in 1952
1952 establishments in Vermont